Pinotins are a type of pyranoanthocyanins, a class of phenolic compounds found in red wine. One such compound is pinotin A.

See also 
 Wine color

References 

Pyranoanthocyanins